Hendrick may refer to:

People
 Hendrick (given name), alternative spelling of the Dutch given name Hendrik
 Hendrick (surname)
 King Hendrick (disambiguation), one of two Mohawk leaders who have often been conflated:
 Hendrick Tejonihokarawa (1660–c.1735), one of the "Four Mohawk Kings"
 Hendrick Theyanoguin (1692–1755), Mohawk leader associated with Sir William Johnson

Other uses
 Hendrick Cottage, a building in Simsbury, Connecticut, United States
 Hendrick's Gin, Scottish gin brand
 Hendrick Health System, American healthcare provider
 Hendrick Island, large erosional feature in Bucks County, Pennsylvania, United States
 Hendrick Manufacturing Company, American perforated metal manufacturer
 Hendrick Motorsports, American stock car racing team

See also
 Hendricks (disambiguation)
 Hendrich (disambiguation)
 Hendrik (disambiguation)
 Henrick